Xanthus or Xanthos was a town in ancient Lesbos.

The site of Xanthus is unlocated till now.

References

Populated places in the ancient Aegean islands
Former populated places in Greece
Ancient Lesbos
Lost ancient cities and towns